Nicolas Bruneel (born 8 March 1997) is a French professional footballer who plays as a midfielder for Régional 1 club Pays de Cassel.

Career
Bruneel made his professional debut with Dunkerque in a 1–0 Ligue 2 win over Toulouse on 22 August 2020, scoring the only goal in his debut. He was not retained by Dunkerque in the summer of 2022, and signed for amateur side Pays de Cassel.

References

External links
 
 Foot National Profile

1997 births
Living people
Sportspeople from Nord (French department)
French footballers
Association football midfielders
USL Dunkerque players
US Pays de Cassel players
Ligue 2 players
Championnat National players
Championnat National 3 players
Régional 1 players
Footballers from Hauts-de-France